Langarud Rural District is a rural district (dehestan) in Salman Shahr District, Abbasabad County, Mazandaran Province, Iran. At the 2006 census, its population was 10,839, in 2,985 families. The rural district has 25 villages.

References 

Rural Districts of Mazandaran Province
Abbasabad County